Kaamos is the sixth solo album from German ambient music producer, Thomas Köner. It is also the first album Köner released on the label Mille Plateaux.

"Tabula Smaragdina" was recorded live in Auditorium du Louvre, Paris, France in October 1997. It was used as the music to the Jürgen Reble film Chicago.

"Kaamos" is Finnish for "polar night." "Tabula Smaragdina" is Latin for "emerald tablet," it is a mysterious ancient alchemical text.

Track listing
"Kaamos" – 12:24
"Kaamos" – 6:21
"Kaamos" – 12:00
"Tabula Smaragdina" – 24:52

References

1998 albums
Thomas Köner albums
Albums produced by Thomas Köner